ucisa (Universities and Colleges Information Systems Association) is a United Kingdom association which represents the whole of higher education, and increasingly further education, in the provision and development of academic, management and administrative information systems. It is a charitable private limited company, based at Lumen House, Library Avenue, Harwell Campus, Didcot, OX11 0SG, England.

History
ucisa was formed on 1 April 1993, by a merger of three bodies: the Inter-University Computing Committee (IUCC), the Polytechnics and Colleges Computer Committee (PCCC), and the Management Information Systems Committee (MISC). This merger took place in response to the Further and Higher Education Act of 1992 which effectively removed the binary distinction between universities and polytechnics/colleges, creating a single higher education sector.

Description
ucisa represents almost all the major UK universities and higher education colleges and has a growing membership among further education colleges, other educational institutions and commercial organisations interested in information systems and technology in UK education, providing a network of contacts and a lobbying voice.

Information systems and technology are increasingly important in further and higher education. The UK Government, funding bodies and powerful commercial interests recognise this, each bringing its agenda and initiatives to bear on individual institutions. In this evermore complex and demanding climate, ucisa plays an important role as the key membership organisation representing those responsible for delivering information systems and technology services in universities, colleges and related institutions.

Although mainly for the higher education sector, increasing integration, shared concerns across sectors mean that ucisa membership is appropriate for many other types of educational institution. ucisa is also relevant to those with a commercial interest in the education sector, especially through the annual conferences, which provide an opportunity to meet those involved in information systems and technology delivery within universities and colleges.

ucisa provides a national and international presence for the people who work on information systems and services. It helps them to share best practice, maximise cost-effectiveness, develop ideas and inform and support policy making within their institution, nationally and internationally.

Aims
ucisa exists to promote excellence in the application of information systems and services in support of teaching, learning, research and administration in higher and further education. Its aims are to identify best practice and to spread its use through:

 the organisation of conferences, seminars and workshops;
 the promotion and support of collaboration between institutions;
 the publication, including electronic publication, of material;
 the promotion of development and research;
 and to inform and support policy-making processes within institutions and nationally on the cost-effective application of information systems and services.

Organisation
The activities of ucisa are partly devolved to interest-specific working groups; these are:

 ucisa-DIG (Digital Infrastructure Group) – the focal point for activities that sit between the hardware and application programs and monitors and promotes the communications network, associated network services and network security.
 ucisa-CISG (Corporate Information Systems Group) – deals with corporate information or management information systems and administrative computing services.
 ucisa-PCMG (Project and Change Management group - brings together and supports all those who deliver change 
 ucisa-SSG (Support Services Group) – offers assistance for members on information, computer-based learning and computer-mediated communications systems.
 ucisa-DCG (Digital Capabilities group 
 ucisa-DEG (Digital Education Group) - acts as a bridge between IT provision and Technology Enhanced Learning (TEL) in support of education and aims to identify areas of interest related to the use of technology in support of teaching and learning activities.
 ucisa-PG (Procurement Group) – an advisory body to develop value for money in ICT purchasing.
 ucisa-WiT (Women In Tech) -  highlights the success of women already working in IT roles in HE and FE. 
 ucisa-EA (Enterprise Architecture) - brings together people with an interest in setting a vision, adopting, developing and disseminating best practices and awareness of Enterprise Architecture and how it is evolving to meet the needs of the UK HE & FE sector.
 HEIDS Higher Education Information Directors Scotland 

UCISA works with other advisory bodies in the sector and associated sectors, such as the Jisc, Becta, UKOLN, CAUDIT, AUDE, BUDFG and SCONUL.

References

External links
ucisa website

1993 establishments in the United Kingdom
Non-profit organisations based in the United Kingdom
British companies established in 1993
College and university associations and consortia in the United Kingdom
Companies associated with the University of Oxford
Companies based in Oxford
Higher education in the United Kingdom
Information technology organisations based in the United Kingdom
Organisations associated with the University of Oxford
Organizations established in 1993
Science and technology in Oxfordshire